The 1908 Georgia Bulldogs baseball team represented the Georgia Bulldogs of the University of Georgia in the 1908 IAAUS baseball season, winning the SIAA championship.

Roster

Schedule and results

References

Georgia Bulldogs
Georgia Bulldogs baseball seasons
Southern Intercollegiate Athletic Association baseball champion seasons
Georgia Bull